The men's rings competition at the 1952 Summer Olympics was held at Töölö Sports Hall, Exhibition Hall I from 19 to 21 July. It was the eighth appearance of the event. There were 185 competitors from 29 nations, with each nation sending up to 8 gymnasts. The Soviet Union, in its debut in the event, won a medal of every color but did not quite sweep the medals as there was a tie for third. Hrant Shahinyan was the winner, Viktor Chukarin took silver, and Dmytro Leonkin shared bronze with Hans Eugster of Switzerland.

Background

This was the eighth appearance of the event, which is one of the five apparatus events held every time there were apparatus events at the Summer Olympics (no apparatus events were held in 1900, 1908, 1912, or 1920). Four of the top 10 gymnasts from 1948 returned: bronze medalist Zdeněk Růžička of Czechoslovakia, fifth-place finisher Josef Stalder of Switzerland, and eighth-place finisher Heikki Savolainen (who had also been in the top 10 in 1932 and 1936) and ninth-place finisher Olavi Rove of Finland. The reigning (1950) world champion, Walter Lehmann of Switzerland, was not competing in Helsinki. Rove had taken second, with Hans Eugster third.

Belgium, India, Norway, Poland, Portugal, Saar, South Africa, the Soviet Union, Spain, and Sweden each made their debut in the men's rings. The United States made its seventh appearance, most of any nation, having missed only the inaugural 1896 Games. Of the 22 different nations that had competed at least once in the event before 1952, 19 competed in Helsinki (only Greece, Mexico, and the Netherlands were missing among the nations having previously competed).

Competition format

The gymnastics format continued to use the aggregation format. Each nation entered a team of between five and eight gymnasts or up to three individual gymnasts. All entrants in the gymnastics competitions performed both a compulsory exercise and a voluntary exercise for each apparatus. The 2 exercise scores were summed to give a total for the apparatus.

No separate finals were contested.

For each exercise, four judges gave scores from 0 to 10 in one-tenth point increments. The top and bottom scores were discarded and the remaining two scores averaged to give the exercise total. Thus, exercise scores ranged from 0 to 10 and apparatus scores from 0 to 20.

The competitor had the option to make a second try only on the compulsory exercise—with the second attempt counting regardless of whether it was better than the first.

Schedule

All times are Eastern European Summer Time (UTC+3)

Results

References

Men's rings
1952
Men's 1952
Men's events at the 1952 Summer Olympics